Union Pacific 5511 is a 2-10-2 “Santa Fe” type steam locomotive built by the Baldwin Locomotive Works in 1923 as part of the Union Pacific Railroad's TTT-6 class. It is the last remaining member of its class and the only remaining 2-10-2 to be operated by the Union Pacific.

The locomotive ran in revenue service until being withdrawn in 1956. Since then, it has remained in storage in the UP's roundhouse in Cheyenne, Wyoming. In April 2022, Union Pacific announced that No. 5511 was among several pieces of equipment to be donated to Railroad Heritage of Midwest America (RRHMA) in Silvis, Illinois, with plans to rebuild No. 5511 for operational purposes once Challenger No. 3985 is rebuilt.

History

Revenue service 
Between 1917 and 1924, the Union Pacific Railroad purchased 144 2-10-2 "Santa Fe" types, divided into classes TTT-1 through TTT-7. American Locomotive Company (ALCO) built 18, Baldwin Locomotive Works built 88 and Lima Locomotive Works built 37. Despite the divided classes, all of the UP 2-10-2s had the same cylinder dimensions, driving wheel diameter and boiler pressure.

No. 5511 was the twelfth member of twenty-five TTT-6's to be built in 1923. It was initially assigned to pull heavy freight trains over the steep grades of the Wasatch Mountain Range between Ogden, Utah and Green River, Wyoming. With the eventual introduction of the 4-6-6-4 "Challengers", which would be more capable of climbing steep grades than the 2-10-2s, No. 5511 was reassigned to pull long freight trains across the Great Plains in Wyoming, Nebraska, and Iowa. Sometimes, the locomotive would also be used to help push other freight trains up Sherman Hill. 

By the end of 1956, No. 5511 was removed from the UP's active list before it was used as a stationary boiler in Ogden, and then Green River. In December 1958, No. 5511 was filmed to appear in Last of the Giants, a UP film that mostly featured the railroad's 4-8-8-4 "Big Boys". During filming, because the locomotive was no longer operational, it was coupled to a string of freight cars with an EMD diesel locomotive coupled to the other side to push, while No. 5511 would have burning tires inside the firebox. After filming was finished, the locomotive was sent to Cheyenne, where its piston rods were cut, and it was scheduled to be scrapped with the rest of the UP's 2-10-2s. However, an unknown employee had ordered the locomotive to be withheld for preservation due to its movie appearance. As a result, the locomotive was stored inside the UP's roundhouse in Cheyenne.

Preservation 
By the end of the 1960s, No. 5511 became the only 2-10-2 locomotive from the UP to be preserved. The locomotive was repainted for a cleaner appearance and stored inside the UP's Cheyenne Roundhouse for the next six decades. During that time, the locomotive was repainted and moved onto a turntable to be displayed for a National Railway Historical Society (NRHS) convention. Subsequently, the locomotive was stored without boiler jacketing.

In April 2022, the UP announced that No. 5511 would be among four locomotives to be donated to the Railroading Heritage of Midwest America (RRHMA), with the others being 4-6-6-4 No. 3985, EMD DDA40X "Centennial" No. 6936, and an EMD E9 B unit. Several other pieces of rolling stock from the heritage fleet were also included in the donation. The RRHMA has plans to rebuild both Numbers 5511 and 3985. On May 13, 2022, RRHMA launched a fundraiser to raise enough money for the restoration of the Nos. 5511 and 3985 steam locomotives. In November of that same year, UP moved 5511 and the rest of the donated equipment to the RRHMA's large shop facility in Silvis, Illinois. As of 2023, No. 5511 remains stored, awaiting operational restoration.

See also 
 Southern Pacific 975
 Southern Pacific 5021

References

External links
 UP No. 5511 TTT-6
 Locomotive #5511 – Santa Fe
 UP Steam

Individual locomotives of the United States
5511
Baldwin locomotives
Freight locomotives
Railway locomotives introduced in 1923
Standard gauge locomotives of the United States
2-10-2 locomotives
Preserved steam locomotives of Illinois